The 1960–61 Oberliga  was the sixteenth season of the Oberliga, the first tier of the football league system in West Germany. The league operated in five regional divisions, Berlin, North, South, Southwest and West. The five league champions and the runners-up from the west, south, southwest and north then entered the 1961 German football championship which was won by 1. FC Nürnberg. It was 1. FC Nürnberg's eighth national championship and its first since 1948.

A similar-named league, the DDR-Oberliga, existed in East Germany, set at the first tier of the East German football league system. The 1960 DDR-Oberliga was won by ASK Vorwärts Berlin, after which the league reverted to the traditional autumn-spring format and held its next season in 1961–62 .

Oberliga Nord
The 1960–61 season saw two new clubs in the league, VfB Oldenburg and Heider SV, both promoted from the Amateurliga. The league's top scorer was Uwe Seeler of Hamburger SV with 29 goals, the highest total for any scorer in the five Oberligas in 1960–61.

Oberliga Berlin
The 1960–61 season saw two new clubs in the league, Kickers 1900 Berlin and BFC Südring, both promoted from the Amateurliga Berlin. The league's top scorer was Helmut Faeder of Hertha BSC Berlin with 17 goals.

Oberliga West
The 1960–61 season saw two new clubs in the league, SV Sodingen and TSV Marl-Hüls, both promoted from the 2. Oberliga West. The league's top scorer was Jürgen Schütz of Borussia Dortmund with 27 goals.

Oberliga Südwest
The 1960–61 season saw two new clubs in the league, TuS Neuendorf and SV Niederlahnstein, both promoted from the 2. Oberliga Südwest. The league's top scorer was Josef Christ of Sportfreunde Saarbrücken with 25 goals.

Oberliga Süd
The 1960–61 season saw two new clubs in the league, Jahn Regensburg and SV Waldhof Mannheim, both promoted from the 2. Oberliga Süd. The league's top scorer were Rudolf Brunnenmeier, TSV 1860 München, and Erwin Stein, Eintracht Frankfurt, with 23 goals each.

German championship

The 1961 German football championship was contested by the nine qualified Oberliga teams and won by 1. FC Nürnberg, defeating Borussia Dortmund in the final. The runners-up of the Oberliga Süd and Südwest played a pre-qualifying match. The remaining eight clubs then played a home-and-away round in two groups of four. The two group winners then advanced to the final.

Qualifying

|}

Group 1

Group 2

Final

|}

References

Sources
 30 Jahre Bundesliga  30th anniversary special, publisher: kicker Sportmagazin, published: 1993
 kicker-Almanach 1990  Yearbook of German football, publisher: kicker Sportmagazin, published: 1989, 
 DSFS Liga-Chronik seit 1945  publisher: DSFS, published: 2005
 100 Jahre Süddeutscher Fußball-Verband  100 Years of the Southern German Football Federation, publisher: SFV, published: 1997

External links
 The Oberligas on Fussballdaten.de 

1960-61
1
Ger